The 16th CARIFTA Games was held in Port of Spain, Trinidad and Tobago on April 18–20, 1987.

Participation (unofficial)

For the 1987 CARIFTA Games, only the medalists can be found on the "World Junior Athletics History" website.  An unofficial count yields the number of about 115 medalists (67 junior (under-20) and 48 youth (under-17)) from about 13 countries: Bahamas (23), Barbados (11), Bermuda (2), Cayman Islands (4), Dominica (2), Guadeloupe (5), Guyana (2), Jamaica (36), Martinique (9), Netherlands Antilles (1), Saint Kitts and Nevis (2), Saint Vincent and the Grenadines (4), Trinidad and Tobago (14).

Austin Sealy Award

The Austin Sealy Trophy for the most outstanding athlete of the games was awarded to Nicole Springer from Barbados.  She won the high jump gold medal in the junior (U-20) category.

Medal summary
Medal winners are published by category: Boys under 20 (Junior), Girls under 20 (Junior), Boys under 17 (Youth), and Girls under 17 (Youth).
The medalists can also be found on the "World Junior Athletics History" website.

Boys under 20 (Junior)

Girls under 20 (Junior)

Boys under 17 (Youth)

Girls under 17 (Youth)

Medal table (unofficial)

References

External links
World Junior Athletics History

CARIFTA Games
1987 in Trinidad and Tobago sport
CARIFTA
1987 in Caribbean sport
International athletics competitions hosted by Trinidad and Tobago